"Problems" is a song released in 1958 by The Everly Brothers. The song spent 15 weeks on the Billboard Hot 100 chart, peaking at No. 2, "Problems" was kept out of No.1 spot by To Know Him Is to Love Him by The Teddy Bears.

Outside the US
Outside the US, "Problems" reached No. 5 on Canada's CHUM Hit Parade, No. 5 in the Netherlands, and No. 6 on the UK's New Musical Express chart.

Chart performance

References

1958 songs
1958 singles
The Everly Brothers songs
Songs written by Felice and Boudleaux Bryant
Cadence Records singles